Martine Gaillard (born May 21, 1971) is a Canadian sports television personality currently working for Rogers Sportsnet as a co-host of the Sportsnet Central program.

After graduating from Evan Hardy Collegiate in Saskatoon, Saskatchewan, Gaillard attended Ryerson University, from which she graduated with a degree in Radio and Television Arts. Gaillard then worked for a time at The Weather Network and as a game host for Toronto Maple Leafs broadcasts before joining The Score as their first-ever female anchor.

During her time at The Score, Gaillard co-hosted The Score Tonight alongside Greg Sansone for six years and covered events such as the 2000 World Series (a.k.a. the "Subway Series"), MLB and NHL all-star games. She was also hired as part of CBC's Hockey Night in Canada team, and got to work rinkside at hockey games with her idol, CBC hockey anchor Ron MacLean.

In August 2005, it was announced that Gaillard had taken a job at Rogers Sportsnet. She made her debut on the network on October 4, 2005 as co-anchor of Sportsnetnews alongside Mike Toth.

References

External links
 Bio @ Rogers Sportsnet Website

1971 births
Living people
Canadian horse racing announcers
Canadian television sportscasters
National Hockey League broadcasters
People from Melfort, Saskatchewan
Toronto Metropolitan University alumni
Women sports announcers
Canadian women television personalities
Fransaskois people